KTTR-FM is a Talk formatted broadcast radio station licensed to St. James, Missouri, serving the Rolla/Cuba/Owensville area. Besides carrying The Rush Limbaugh Show the station airs The Sean Hannity Show, The Dave Ramsey Show, and The Jim Bohannon Show.  KTTR-FM is owned and operated by Results Radio.

References

External links
 KTTR NewsRadio Online
 

TTR-FM